Lul is a village in South Sudan.

Lul or LUL may also refer to:

LUL (symbol), an emote on twitch featuring a picture of video game reviewer TotalBiscuit.
Lambda Upsilon Lambda, an American fraternity
London Underground Limited, operator of the London Underground
Olu’bo language (ISO 639-3 code)

People with the given name Lul
Lul Krag (1878–1956), a Norwegian painter
Ras Lul Seged (died 1916), an Ethiopian military leader

See also
Lull (disambiguation)
Lol (disambiguation)
Lule (disambiguation)
Lullism
Lullus
Ramon Llull